North Haven High School is a public high school located at 221 Elm Street in North Haven, Connecticut. It has an enrollment of approximately 1,300 students in grades 9 through 12.

Notable alumni

Dan Fegan, NBA agent
Paul Householder, MLB player 
Robert Kagan, American historian, author, columnist, and foreign-policy commentator
Paul Marcarelli, Actor know for his commercials at Verizon and T-Mobile
Tiffany Weimer, professional soccer player

References

External links
 Official website

North Haven, Connecticut
Public high schools in Connecticut
Schools in New Haven County, Connecticut